Felix Örn Friðriksson (born 16 March 1999) is an Icelandic football defender, who currently plays for ÍBV.

Club career
Felix was loaned out to Vejle Boldklub on 24 July 2018, but the loan deal was terminated half a year before the supposed time on 17 December 2018.

International career
Felix has been involved with the U-17 and U-21 teams, and made his senior team debut in an unofficial friendly against Indonesia Selection on 11 January 2018.

References

External links
 
 
 

Fridricksson, Felix Orn
Fridricksson, Felix Orn
Fridricksson, Felix Orn
Icelandic footballers
Iceland youth international footballers
Iceland under-21 international footballers
Iceland international footballers
Íþróttabandalag Vestmannaeyja players
Vejle Boldklub players
Úrvalsdeild karla (football) players
Danish Superliga players
1. deild karla players
Icelandic expatriate footballers
Expatriate men's footballers in Denmark
Icelandic expatriate sportspeople in Denmark